Rafael Zuñiga Medrano (born May 6, 1963 in Bolívar) is a retired Colombian boxer, who represented his native country at the 1984 Summer Olympics in Los Angeles in the Men's Featherweight division. Zuñiga won the bronze medal in the same weight category a year earlier at the 1983 Pan American Games.

References
 sports-reference

1963 births
Living people
Featherweight boxers
Olympic boxers of Colombia
Pan American Games bronze medalists for Colombia
Boxers at the 1983 Pan American Games
Boxers at the 1984 Summer Olympics
People from Bolívar Department
Colombian male boxers
Pan American Games medalists in boxing
Medalists at the 1983 Pan American Games
20th-century Colombian people